Mitra is a 2021 Dutch drama film directed by Iranian-Dutch filmmaker Kaweh Modiri. The film was an adaptation of a non-fiction book by Modiri about the real-life experiences of his mother.  It premiered on the International Film Festival Rotterdam.  It also played at the Movies that Matter-festival in The Hague and the Netherlands Film Festival.

Plot
The daughter of Haleh was betrayed and executed in the aftermath of the Iranian Revolution. 37 years later, in the Netherlands, she is confronted by the woman who betrayed her daughter.

Cast
 Jasmin Tabatabai as Haleh
 Mohsen Namjoo as 	Mohsen
 Shabnam Toloui
 Avin Manshadi as Nilu
 Sallie Harmsen as Clara
 Dina Zarif as Mitra
 Aram Ghasemy as Parisa

References

External links 
 

2021 films
Dutch drama films
2020s Persian-language films
2021 drama films